The Louis Curtiss Studio Building is a three-story building in Kansas City, Missouri listed on the National Register of Historic Places.

The studio was built in 1909.  It was designed by architect Louis Curtiss and served as his studio.  It was listed on the U.S. National Register of Historic Places in 1972.

Curtiss died in 1924 at his studio residence in downtown Kansas City, Missouri.

References

Commercial buildings on the National Register of Historic Places in Missouri
Buildings and structures completed in 1909
Buildings and structures in Kansas City, Missouri
National Register of Historic Places in Kansas City, Missouri